Wellesley Square station is a commuter rail station on the MBTA Commuter Rail Framingham/Worcester Line, located just north of the MA 16-MA 135 intersection in downtown Wellesley, Massachusetts. It serves both walk-up and park-and-ride commuters, with a 224-space parking lot for the latter group. The station has low-level platforms and is not accessible.

History

The Boston & Worcester Railroad (B&W), extending outwards from Boston, reached through the West Parish of Needham in mid-1834. In 1839, the line was double tracked through the area. A station on the (B&W) opened at West Needham around 1850. It was renamed to Wellesley after the adjacent village in 1863, though the West Parish did not formerly separate from Needham to become Wellesley until 1881.  The wood-framed building was moved half a mile to the east in 1889 (where it still stands, in use as a restaurant), when H. H. Richardson's successors Shepley, Rutan and Coolidge designed a stone Richardsonian Romanesque station for the Boston & Albany Railroad (B&A), which had taken over the B&W.

The 1889-built depot was demolished around 1962 to make room for a post office; only bare asphalt platforms remained. Amtrak Inland Route service served it until 1975, and from 1984 to 1986, but intercity ridership was very low compared to MBTA Commuter Rail ridership. In 1977 or 1978, the station was renamed Wellesley Square to differentiate it from the other two stations in Wellesley.

In 2019, the MBTA listed Wellesley Square as a "Tier I" accessibility priority. In June 2021, the MBTA issued a $28 million design contract for a project to add a third track from Weston to Framingham, including reconstruction of the three Wellesley stations and West Natick station. The project was expected to cost around $400 million, of which rebuilding Wellesley Square station would be $31-35 million, with completion in 2030.

References

External links

MBTA - Wellesley Square
 HABS entry for Shepley, Rutan and Coolidge station
 Former Wellesley Amtrak Station (USA RailGuide -- TrainWeb)

Former Boston and Albany Railroad stations
MBTA Commuter Rail stations in Norfolk County, Massachusetts
Former Amtrak stations in Massachusetts
Railway stations in the United States opened in 1889
Romanesque Revival architecture in Massachusetts
Wellesley, Massachusetts